Lev Borisovich Kamenev (né Rozenfeld;  – 25 August 1936) was a Bolshevik revolutionary and a prominent Soviet politician.

Born in Moscow to parents who were both involved in revolutionary politics, Kamenev attended Imperial Moscow University before becoming a revolutionary himself, joining the Russian Social Democratic Labour Party (RSDLP) in 1901 and was active in Moscow, Saint Petersburg and Tiflis (now Tbilisi). He took part in the failed Russian Revolution of 1905. Relocating abroad in 1908, Kamenev became an early member of the Bolsheviks and a close associate of the exiled Vladimir Lenin. In 1914, he was arrested on his return to Saint Petersburg and exiled in Siberia, but was able to return following the February Revolution of 1917 which overthrew the Tsarist monarchy. In 1917, he served briefly as the equivalent of the first head of state of Soviet Russia. Kamenev disagreed with Lenin's strategy of armed uprising during the October Revolution, but nevertheless remained in a position of power after the fall of the Provisional Government. In 1919, he was elected as a full member of the first Politburo.

During Lenin's final illness in 1923–24, Kamenev was the acting leader of the Soviet Union, forming a troika with Grigory Zinoviev and Joseph Stalin which led to Leon Trotsky's downfall. Stalin subsequently turned against his former allies and ousted Kamenev from the Soviet leadership. Along with Zinoviev, he was expelled from the party three times. Kamenev was arrested in 1935 following the assassination of Sergei Kirov and made a chief defendant in 1936 Trial of the Sixteen, which marked the start of the Great Purge. He was found guilty during the show trial and executed by a firing squad on 25 August. He coincidentally died on the same day as Sergey Kamenev, with whom he was not related.

Early life and career
Kamenev was born as Leo Rosenfeld in Moscow, the son of a Jewish railway worker who was a convert to Russian Christian Orthodoxy and an ethnic Russian Orthodox Christian mother. Both of his parents were active in radical politics. His father used the capital he earned in the construction of the Baku–Batumi railway to pay for Lev's education. Kamenev attended the boys' Gymnasium in Tiflis, Georgia (now Tbilisi) and later Moscow University where he became involved in political activity. His arrest in 1902 interrupted his formal education. From that point on, he worked as a professional revolutionary, and was active in the capital St. Petersburg, Moscow and Tiflis. He adopted the surname Kamenev during this period. In the early 1900s, he married Olga Bronstein, a fellow Marxist (and younger sister of Leon Trotsky, who had also adopted a different surname). The couple had two sons together.

Kamenev joined the Social Democrats in 1901. He took a brief trip abroad in 1902, meeting Russian social democratic leaders living in exile, including Vladimir Lenin, whose adherent and close associate he became. He also visited Paris and met the Iskra group who published the newspaper. After attending the 3rd Congress of the Russian Social Democratic Labour Party (RSDLP) in London in March 1905, Kamenev returned to Russia to participate in the Russian Revolution of 1905 in St. Petersburg in October–December.

He went back to London to attend the 5th RSDLP Party Congress, where he was elected to the party's Central Committee and the Bolshevik Center, in May 1907, but was arrested upon his return to Russia. After Kamenev was released from prison in 1908, he and his family went abroad later in the year to help Lenin edit the Bolshevik magazine Proletariy. After Lenin's split with another senior Bolshevik leader, Alexander Bogdanov, in mid-1908, Kamenev and Grigory Zinoviev became Lenin's main assistants abroad. They helped him expel Bogdanov and his Otzovist (Recallist) followers from the Bolshevik faction of the RSDLP in mid-1909.

In January 1910, Leninists, followers of Bogdanov, and various Menshevik factions held a meeting of the party's Central Committee in Paris and tried to re-unite the party. Kamenev and Zinoviev were dubious about the idea, but were willing to give it a try under pressure from "conciliator" Bolsheviks like Victor Nogin. Lenin was adamantly opposed to re-unification, but was outvoted within the Bolshevik leadership. The meeting reached a tentative agreement. As one of its provisions, Trotsky's Vienna-based Pravda was designated as a party-financed 'central organ'. Kamenev, Trotsky's brother-in-law, was added to Pravda's editorial board as a representative of the Bolsheviks in this process. The unification attempts failed in August 1910, when Kamenev resigned from the board amid mutual recriminations.

After the failure of the reunification attempt, Kamenev continued working for Proletariy and taught at the Bolshevik party school at Longjumeau near Paris. It had been founded as a Leninist alternative to Bogdanov's Party School based in Capri. In January 1912, Kamenev helped Lenin and Zinoviev to convince the Prague Conference of Bolshevik delegates to split from the Mensheviks and Otzovists.

In January 1914, he was sent to St. Petersburg to direct the work of the Bolshevik version of Pravda and the Bolshevik faction of the Duma. Kamenev was arrested in November and tried, where he distanced himself from Lenin's anti-war stance. In early 1915, Kamenev was sentenced to exile in Siberia; he survived two years there until being freed by the successful February Revolution of 1917.

Before leaving Siberia, Kamenev proposed sending a telegram thanking the Tsar's brother Mikhail for refusing the throne. He was so embarrassed later by his action that he denied ever having sent it.

On 25 March 1917, Kamenev returned from Siberian exile to St. Petersburg (renamed as Petrograd in 1914). Kamenev and Central Committee members Joseph Stalin and Matvei Muranov took control of the revived Bolshevik Pravda and moved it to the Right. Kamenev formulated a policy of conditional support of the newly formed Russian Provisional Government and a reconciliation with the Mensheviks. After Lenin's return to Russia on 3 April 1917, Kamenev briefly resisted Lenin's anti-government April Theses, but soon fell in line and supported Lenin until September.
Kamenev and Zinoviev had a falling out with Lenin over their opposition to Soviet seizure of power in October 1917. On 10 October 1917 (Old Style), Kamenev and Zinoviev were the only two Central Committee members to vote against an armed revolt. Their publication of an open letter opposed to the use of force enraged Lenin, who demanded their expulsion from the party. However, when the Bolshevik-led Military Revolutionary Committee, headed by Adolph Joffe, and the Petrograd Soviet, led by Trotsky, staged an uprising, Kamenev and Zinoviev went along. At the Second All-Russian Congress of Soviets, Kamenev was elected Congress Chairman and Chairman of the permanent All-Russian Central Executive Committee. The latter position was equivalent to the head of state under the Soviet system.

On 10 November 1917, three days after the Soviet seizure of power during the October Revolution, the executive committee of the national railroad labor union, Vikzhel, threatened a national strike unless the Bolsheviks shared power with other socialist parties and dropped the uprising's leaders, Lenin and Trotsky, from the government. Zinoviev, Kamenev and their allies in the Bolshevik Central Committee argued that the Bolsheviks had no choice but to start negotiations, since a railroad strike would cripple their government's ability to fight the forces that were still loyal to the overthrown Provisional Government. Although Zinoviev and Kamenev briefly had the support of a Central Committee majority and negotiations were started, a quick collapse of the anti-Bolshevik forces outside Petrograd aided Lenin and Trotsky to convince the Central Committee to abandon the negotiating process. In response, Zinoviev, Kamenev, Alexei Rykov, Vladimir Milyutin and Victor Nogin resigned from the Central Committee on 4 November 1917 (Old Style) and Kamenev resigned from his Central Executive Committee post. The following day Lenin wrote a proclamation calling Zinoviev and Kamenev "deserters." He never forgot their behavior, eventually making an ambiguous reference to their "October episode" in his Testament.

Opposition to Trotsky
In 1918, Kamenev became chairman of the Moscow Soviet, and soon thereafter Lenin's Deputy Chairman of the Council of People's Commissars (government) and the Council of Labour and Defence. In March 1919, Kamenev was elected as a full member of the first Politburo. His personal relationship with his brother-in-law Trotsky, which was good in the aftermath of the 1917 revolution and during the Russian Civil War, lessened after 1920. For the next 15 years, Kamenev was a friend and close ally of Grigory Zinoviev, who exceeded him in ambition.

During Lenin's illness, Kamenev was appointed as the acting President of the Council of People's Commissars and Politburo chairman. Together with Zinoviev and Joseph Stalin, he formed a ruling 'triumvirate' (or 'troika') in the Communist Party, and played a key role in the marginalization of Trotsky. The triumvirate carefully managed the intra-party debate and delegate selection process in the fall of 1923 during the run-up to the 13th Party Conference, securing a vast majority of the seats. The Conference, held in January 1924 immediately prior to Lenin's death, denounced Trotsky and "Trotskyism."

In the spring of 1924, while the triumvirate was criticizing the policies of Trotsky and the Left Opposition as "anti-Leninist", the tensions between the volatile Zinoviev and his close ally Kamenev on one hand, and the cautious Stalin on the other, became more pronounced and threatened to end their fragile alliance. However, Zinoviev and Kamenev helped Stalin retain his position as General Secretary of the Central Committee at the XIIIth Party Congress in May–June 1924 during the first Lenin's Testament controversy, ensuring that the triumvirate gained more political advantage at Trotsky's expense.

In October 1924, Stalin proposed his new theory of Socialism in One Country in opposition to Trotsky's theory of Permanent revolution, while Trotsky published "Lessons of October," an extensive summary of the events of 1917. In the article, Trotsky described Zinoviev and Kamenev's opposition to the Bolshevik seizure of power in 1917, something that the two would have preferred left unmentioned. This started a new round of intra-party struggle, with Zinoviev and Kamenev once again allied with Stalin against Trotsky. They and their supporters accused Trotsky of various mistakes and worse during the Russian Civil War. Trotsky was ill and unable to respond much to the criticism, and the triumvirate damaged Trotsky's military reputation so much that he was forced out of his ministerial post as People's Commissar of Army and Fleet Affairs and Chairman of the Revolutionary Military Council in January 1925. Zinoviev demanded Trotsky's expulsion from the Communist Party, but Stalin refused to go along with this and skillfully played the role of a moderate.

At the XIVth Conference of the Communist Party in April 1925, Zinoviev and Kamenev found themselves in a minority when their motion to specify that socialism could only be achieved internationally was rejected, resulting in the triumvirate of recent years breaking up. At this time, Stalin was moving more and more into a political alliance with Nikolai Bukharin and the Right Opposition, with Bukharin having elaborated on Stalin's Socialism in One Country policy, giving it a theoretical justification.

Break with Stalin (1925)

With Trotsky mostly on the sidelines through a persistent illness, the Zinoviev-Kamenev-Stalin triumvirate collapsed in April 1925, although the political situation was hanging in the balance for the rest of the year. All sides spent most of 1925 lining up support behind the scenes for the December Communist Party Congress. Stalin struck an alliance with Nikolai Bukharin, a Communist Party theoretician and Pravda editor, and the Soviet prime minister Alexei Rykov. Zinoviev and Kamenev strengthened their alliance with Lenin's widow, Nadezhda Krupskaya, and also aligned with Grigori Sokolnikov, the People's Commissar for Finance and a candidate Politburo member. Their alliance became known as the New Opposition.

The struggle became more open at the September 1925 meeting of the Central Committee, and came to a head at the XIVth Party Congress in December 1925, when Kamenev publicly demanded the removal of Stalin from the position of the General Secretary. With only the Leningrad delegation (controlled by Zinoviev) behind them, Zinoviev and Kamenev found themselves in a tiny minority and were soundly defeated. Trotsky remained silent during the Congress. Zinoviev was re-elected to the Politburo, but Kamenev was demoted from a full member to a non-voting member, and Sokolnikov was dropped altogether. Stalin succeeded in having more of his allies elected to the Politburo.

Opposition to Stalin (1926–1927)

In early 1926, Zinoviev, Kamenev and their supporters gravitated closer to Trotsky's supporters; with the two groups forming an alliance, which became known as the United Opposition. During a new period of intra-Party fighting between the July 1926 meeting of the Central Committee and the XVth Party Conference in October 1926, the United Opposition was defeated and Kamenev lost his Politburo seat at the Conference.

Kamenev continued to oppose Stalin throughout 1926 and 1927, resulting in his expulsion from the Central Committee in October 1927. After the expulsion of Zinoviev and Trotsky from the Communist Party on 12 November 1927, Kamenev was the United Opposition's chief spokesman within the Party, representing its position at the XVth Party Congress in December 1927. Kamenev used the occasion to appeal for reconciliation among the groups. His speech was interrupted 24 times by his opponents – Bukharin, Ryutin, and Kaganovich, making it clear that Kamenev's attempts were futile. The Congress declared United Opposition views incompatible with Communist Party membership; it expelled Kamenev and dozens of leading Oppositionists from the Party. This paved the way for mass expulsions in 1928 of rank-and-file Oppositionists, as well as sending prominent Left Oppositionists into internal exile.

Kamenev's first marriage, which had begun to disintegrate in 1920, as a result of his reputed affair with the British sculptor Clare Sheridan, ended in divorce in 1928 when he left Olga Kameneva and married Tatiana Glebova. They had a son together, Vladimir Glebov (1929–1994).

Submission to Stalin and execution
While Trotsky remained firm in his opposition to Stalin after his expulsion from the Party and subsequent exile, Zinoviev and Kamenev capitulated almost immediately and called on their supporters to follow suit. They wrote open letters acknowledging their mistakes and were readmitted to the Communist Party after a six-month cooling-off period. They never regained their Central Committee seats, but they were given mid-level positions within the Soviet bureaucracy. Kamenev and, indirectly, Zinoviev, were courted by Bukharin, then at the beginning of his short and ill-fated struggle with Stalin, in the summer of 1928. This activity was soon reported to Joseph Stalin and used against Bukharin as proof of his factionalism.

Zinoviev and Kamenev remained politically inactive until October 1932, when they were expelled from the Communist Party, after receiving an oppositionist group's appeal but not informing the party on their activities during the Ryutin Affair. After again admitting their alleged errors, they were readmitted in December 1933. They were forced to make self-flagellating speeches at the 17th Party Congress in January 1934, where Stalin paraded his erstwhile political opponents, showing them to be defeated and outwardly contrite.

The murder of Sergei Kirov on 1 December 1934 was a catalyst for what are called Stalin's Great Purges, as he initiated show trials and executions of opponents. Grigory Zinoviev, Kamenev and their closest associates were again expelled from the Communist Party and arrested. 

During this time Kamenev wrote a letter to Stalin, saying:
At a time when my soul is filled with nothing but love for the party and its leadership, when, having lived through hesitations and doubts, I can boldly say that I learned to highly trust the Central Committee's every step and every decision you, Comrade Stalin, make. I have been arrested for my ties to people that are strange and disgusting to me.

The men were tried in January 1935 and were forced to admit "moral complicity" in Kirov's assassination. Zinoviev was sentenced to ten years in prison and Kamenev to five. Kamenev was charged separately in early 1935 in connection with the Kremlin Case and, although he refused to confess, was sentenced to ten years in prison. In August 1936, after months of rehearsal in Soviet secret police prisons, Zinoviev, Kamenev and 14 others, mostly Old Bolsheviks, were put on trial again. This time the charges including forming a terrorist organization that allegedly killed Kirov and tried to kill Stalin and other leaders of the Soviet government. This Trial of the Sixteen (or the trial of the "Trotskyite-Zinovievite Terrorist Center") was one of the Moscow Show Trials and set the stage for subsequent show trials. Old Bolsheviks were forced to confess increasingly elaborate and monstrous crimes, including espionage, poisoning and sabotage. Like other defendants, Kamenev was found guilty and executed by firing squad on 25 August 1936. The fate of his body is unknown. In 1988, during perestroika, Kamenev, Zinoviev and his co-defendants were formally rehabilitated by the Military Collegium of the Supreme Court of the Soviet Union.

Fate of the family
After Kamenev's execution, his relatives suffered similar fates. Kamenev's second son, Yu. L. Kamenev, was executed on 30 January 1938, at the age of 17. His eldest son, Air Force officer A.L. Kamenev, was executed on 15 July 1939, at the age of 33. His first wife, Olga, was executed on 11 September 1941, in the Medvedev forest outside Oryol, together with Christian Rakovsky, Maria Spiridonova, and 160 other prominent political prisoners. Only his youngest son, Vladimir Glebov, survived Stalin's prisons and labor camps, living until 1994.

Notes

References

Further reading

 Corney, Frederick C., ed. Trotsky's Challenge: The "Literary Discussion" of 1924 and the Fight for the Bolshevik Revolution. (Chicago: Haymarket Books, 2017).
 Debo, Richard Kent. "Litvinov and Kamenev—Ambassadors Extraordinary: The Problem of Soviet Representation Abroad." Slavic Review 34.3 (1975): 463–482.  online
 Isaac Deutscher. Stalin: a Political Biography (1949)
 Isaac Deutscher. The Prophet Armed: Trotsky, 1879–1921 (1954)
 Isaac Deutscher. The Prophet Unarmed: Trotsky, 1921–1929 (1959)
 Haupt, Georges, and Jean-Jacques Marie. Makers of the Russian Revolution: Biographies (Routledge, 2017).
 Kotkin,  Stephen. Stalin: Paradoxes of Power, 1878–1928 (2015)  excerpt
 Lih, Lars T. "Fully Armed: Kamenev and Pravda in March 1917." The NEP Era: Soviet Russia 1921–1928, 8 (2014), 55–68(2014). online
 Pipes, Richard. Russia Under the Bolshevik Regime (2011)
 Pogorelskin, Alexis. "Kamenev and the Peasant Question: The Turn to Opposition, 1924–1925." Russian History 27.4 (2000): 381–395. online
 Rabinowitch, Alexander.  Prelude to Revolution: The Petrograd Bolsheviks and the July 1917 Uprising (1968).
 Volkogonov, Dmitri. Lenin. A New Biography (1994),

Other languages
 Ulrich, Jürg: Kamenew: Der gemäßigte Bolschewik. Das kollektive Denken im Umfeld Lenins. VSA Verlag, Hamburg 2006, .
 "Unpersonen": Wer waren sie wirklich? Bucharin, Rykow, Trotzki, Sinowjew, Kamenew. Dietz Verlag, Berlin 1990, .

External links

Lev Kamenev Archive at Marxists.org
Examination of Kamenev during his trial, 20 August 1936.
Leon Trotsky on Kamenev and Grigory Zinoviev
 

1883 births
1936 deaths
People of the Russian Revolution
Deaths by firearm in Russia
Executed heads of state
Expelled members of the Communist Party of the Soviet Union
Great Purge victims from Russia
Heads of state of the Soviet Union
Old Bolsheviks
Chairpersons of the Executive Committee of Mossovet
Politicians from Moscow
Russian Social Democratic Labour Party members
Russian revolutionaries
Soviet Ministers of Defence
Soviet rehabilitations
Jewish Soviet politicians
Treaty of Brest-Litovsk negotiators
Trial of the Sixteen (Great Purge)
Politburo of the Central Committee of the Communist Party of the Soviet Union members
Jewish prime ministers
Jewish socialists
Jews executed by the Soviet Union
Russian socialists
Communist Party of the Soviet Union members
Russian Marxists
Russian people of Jewish descent
Soviet show trials
Ambassadors of the Soviet Union to Italy
People executed by the Soviet Union by firing squad
Left Opposition